Yima railway station is a station on Longhai railway in Yima, Sanmenxia, Henan.

History
The station was established in 1915.

References

Railway stations in Henan
Stations on the Longhai Railway
Railway stations in China opened in 1915